This is a list of traditional windmills in the American state of Rhode Island.

See all having coordinates in "Map all coordinates using OpenSourceMap" at right.

Locations
Known building dates are in bold text. Non-bold text denotes first known date. Iron windpumps are outside the scope of this list unless listed on the National Register of Historic Places.

See also
Wind power in Rhode Island

References

Sources
 

Rhode Island
Windmills